The Royal Land Company of Virginia was established in Rockingham County, Virginia, on March 27, 1876, for the purpose of purchasing and developing mineral lands, mines, and manufacturing their products. It purchased, in 1876, from private parties and corporations, the fee simple and leases of numerous tracts of coal, iron, other mineral, and timber lands in Virginia and West Virginia, aggregating .

Products and services 
The company specialised in bituminous and anthracite coals, hematite, specular and magnetic iron ores, copper, asbestos, marl, manganese and other minerals, building stones, and the agricultural, mechanical, timber, and other resources of the country tributary to its railway lines.

Railroads 

The company operated the following railroads:
Potomac, Fredericksburg and Piedmont Railroad
Shenandoah Valley and Ohio Railroad
Railroad charters in West Virginia

See also 
 Loyal Company of Virginia

References

External links

American companies established in 1876
Real estate companies of the United States